Anna Bettozzi (born July 27 in Rome, Italy), known by her stage name Ana Bettz, is an Italian singer-songwriter, dancer, and former real estate agent. She became well known for releasing her singles "Ecstasy" (1998), "Who Is It Tonight?" (2000), "Black and White" (2001), "Femme" (2003), and "Freedom" (2004), which became well known in Russia, France, and the United Kingdom. All the singles were from her debut studio album, Freedom, which was released in 2003. Her next album, The One, would be released in 2011.

Musical career 
When Bettozzi was young, she thought work was important, and focused on more solid jobs, in which she became a real estate entrepreneur. However, having English been her second language, she aspired working in a more international business. Because singing, songwriting, and dancing was her dream, she decided to start her career all over again and would go by the stage name Ana Bettz.

Ana's first single, "Ecstasy", was written independently with her grandmother and children, and was recorded in her former headquarters of her agency, which was located in Santa Monica and Los Angeles, California, in December 1997. DJ Jay Winding had sent the song to English musician Kofi, so his version with European-like sounds could have a more American flavor. The music video for "Ecstasy" was done in the same country, and includes a shot with a producer for Madonna and Michael Jackson. The video cost 600,000,000 Lire (Euro300,000) to make. The song's U.S. release was slipped by one month. Her second single, "Who Is It Tonight?", would follow, and it would appear on the UK Dance Charts. Her third single, "Black and White", was released in 2001, and sold 500,000 copies in Britain. The video for Black and white is set in a medieval castle, and is entrusted to the Eiffel 65 remix. The next single, "Femme", released in 2003, became well known in France, and its single album included a music video for the song.

Bettz recorded her first studio album, Freedom, at UK production company the Real Word. The album was released September 2003, and was produced by Sony Music Entertainment and Nar International. Singers Peter Gabriel, David Foster and Kofi contributed to the album, with Gabriel handling the mixing and Foster and Kofi producing the track "Don't Say It's Love". Bettz performed the album at an art café in Italy in March 2004, with actresses Martina Stella, Violante Placido, and Isabella Orsini attending.

In January 2011, Ana performed her single, "Move On", on the Italian television show Quelli che... il Calcio. This was a single from her second album, The One, which was released in May 2011. She also performed the single on the February 19, 2011 episode of Top of the Pops. Another single from the album was "You Are The One", which was performed on the television channel Sky TG24 in 2009. Four of her songs from the album were performed by her at the Spazio Novecento in Rome, Italy in 2009.

Personal life 

Anna Bettozzi was born in Rome; her family originated from Boston (MA), USA.
She became friends with politician Silvio Berlusconi, due to the relationship of his mother, Rosa. Her grandmother was American, which was why English became her second language. She has a sister, Maria, and a brother, Cesare. She has a degree in sociology, and is married to Sergio Di Cesare, president of the heating manufacturing company Europetroli. She has two daughters, one born c. 1994 and another born c. 1992, and 2 other older children from her previous marriage. She currently lives in Rome.

Robbery
Between 3:00 and 9:00 am on January 3, 1999, three young men armed with pistols entered into Bettz's home. Bettz was asleep with her two daughters and a maid. Though no physical violence occurred, a total of Lire 100.000.000 (50.000 €) worth of valuables were stolen. Part of these valuables included three collectible watches worth Lire 40.000.000 (20.000 €). Information about the incident was withheld by police until the afternoon of January 4.

Legal problems 
On April 8, 2021, Ana Bettz was arrested in Italy accused of doing business with the Moccia clan of the Camorra and the Mancuso 'ndrina of the 'Ndrangheta.

She was arrested, along with 71 other suspects, following a joint operation by four Italian prosecutors coordinated by the national anti-mafia prosecutor. Accused of criminal association for tax evasion. The family business of Bettozzi, "Max Petroli" - now "Made Petrol Italia Srl" - would not have paid VAT, excise duties and other taxes for over 185 million euros. The work of the prosecutors has highlighted that Max Petroli would have recovered from a serious economic crisis thanks to liquidity injections by some Camorra clans, including those of the Moccia and Casalesi.

Activism
On December 21, 2011, an event conceived by Ana Bettz with the Centers for Prevention and Listening Discomfort was held at the Residence Ripetta in Rome, Italy.

Discography

Studio albums

Singles

Music videos 

Ecstasy
Black and White
Femme
Freedom
You Are The One

References

External links 
Ana Bettz. discogs.com.

Italian women singers
Singers from Rome
1958 births
Living people